Natalia Medvedeva and Natasha Zvereva defeated Kim Il-soon and Paulette Moreno in the final, 6–2, 5–7, 6–0 to win the girls' doubles tennis title at the 1987 Wimbledon Championships.

Seeds

  Yayuk Basuki /  Waya Walalangi (first round)
  Jana Pospíšilová /  Radka Zrubáková (semifinals)
  Jonna Jonerup /  Maria Strandlund (second round)
  Natalia Medvedeva /  Natasha Zvereva (champions)

Draw

Draw

References

External links

Girls' Doubles
Wimbledon Championship by year – Girls' doubles